7072 aluminium alloy is an aluminium alloy, created with just one other element; zinc, at one weight percentage.

Chemical Composition

Physical Properties

Designations  
7072 can be designated as:
 ASTM B209
 ASTM B221
 ASTM B234
 ASTM B241
 ASTM B313
 ASTM B345
 ASTM B404
 ASTM B547

References

External links 
For more properties: http://www.matweb.com/search/datasheet.aspx?matguid=f755b2226d7f40a2ac2d33b5cb1e5dd1

Aluminium–zinc alloys